No Surgery Hours Today is a 1948 Czechoslovak comedy film directed by Vladimír Slavínský and starring Jan Pivec, Dagmar Frýbortová and Paula Valenská.

Cast
 Jan Pivec as Dr. Jakub Johánek
 Dagmar Frýbortová as Růžena Vojtíšková 
 Pavla Vrbenská as Jazz singer Kateřina Kostková 
 Josef Gruss as Attorney Jindřich Plevka  
 Ota Motyčka as Solicitor Brhlík
 Meda Valentová as Dynybylová  
 Jaroslav Mareš as Medicine student Divíšek 
 František Kreuzmann as Patient Blažek
 Drahomíra Hůrková as Plevka's Secretary  
 Alena Pospíšilová as Věra  
 Vladimír Čeřovský as Plevka's Substitute  
 Otto Kinský as Patient Kučera

References

External links 
 

1948 films
1948 comedy films
Czech comedy films
1940s Czech-language films
Films directed by Vladimír Slavínský
Czechoslovak black-and-white films
1940s Czech films